Pete Sampras defeated Andre Agassi in the final, 6–1, 7–5, 6–4 to win the singles tennis title at the 1999 Tennis Masters Cup. It was his fifth and last Tour Finals title.

Àlex Corretja was the reigning champion, but did not qualify.

Seeds

Draw

Finals

White group
Standings are determined by: 1. number of wins; 2. number of matches; 3. in two-players-ties, head-to-head records; 4. in three-players-ties, percentage of sets won, or of games won; 5. steering-committee decision.

Red group
Standings are determined by: 1. number of wins; 2. number of matches; 3. in two-players-ties, head-to-head records; 4. in three-players-ties, percentage of sets won, or of games won; 5. steering-committee decision.

See also
ATP World Tour Finals appearances

External links
Finals Draw
Round robin Draw (White Group)
Round robin Draw (Red Group)

Singles
1999 in German tennis
Tennis tournaments in Germany
Sport in Hanover